The Minerva Theatre is a theatre in Kolkata, built in 1893. It was erected at the site on Beadon Street where the Great National Theatre stood before. The maiden play held on this stage was 'Macbeth'. It was initially owned by Nagendra Bhusan Mukhopaddhaya. In course of time, it witnessed several transfers of ownership. Sri Girish Chandra Ghosh is noted for having given the last spectacular performance of his life in this theatre. "Minerva" was burnt down in a fire in 1922. However, it was renovated and in 1925, it regained its old status and play acting was resumed. The Minerva, along with the Star and The Classic Theatre, were also one of the places where the first motion pictures in Bengal, made by Hiralal Sen, were screened.

See also
Star Theatre, Calcutta
Indian People's Theatre Association

External links
Cathcal, Kaleidoscope
Bengali theatre and stage
Calcutta Theatres

Cinema of Bengal
Bengali theatre
Indian film studios
Cinemas in Kolkata
Theatres in Kolkata